"Red" is a song by Canadian rock band Treble Charger. The song was originally released on their 1994 album, nc17, and was released as a single. It was re-recorded and re-released in 1997 as the third and final single from their album Maybe It's Me.  The song received heavy play on university and college radio and on Much Music.

The single debuted at No. 25 on the Canadian RPM Alternative 30 on 1 December 1997. The single was on the chart for six weeks, reaching its highest rank of No. 20 for the week of 15 December 1997.

"Red" placed at number eight on the greatest Canadian songs of all time in a 1996 poll by music magazine Chart.

Charts

References
Citations

1994 songs
1997 singles
Treble Charger songs